This is a list of airports in Western Sahara, sorted by location.  These airports are also included in the List of airports in Morocco.



Airports 

Airport names shown in bold indicate the airport has scheduled commercial airline service.

 Laayoun Annex Air Base (May be a section of Hassan I Airport GMML/EUN)

There are other unpaved airstrips in Western Sahara:
 Oum Dreyga Airport
 a  marked north–south runway at the Moroccan border control facilities south of Guerguerat.
 one rough dirt airstrip southwest of Tifariti
 two well defined dirt airstrips just west of Al Mahbes

See also 
 Legal status of Western Sahara
 List of airports in Morocco
 Transport in Western Sahara
 List of airports by ICAO code: G#Western Sahara
 Wikipedia: WikiProject Aviation/Airline destination lists: Africa#Western Sahara (claimed by Morocco)

References 

 
  - includes IATA codes
 World Aero Data: Western Sahara - ICAO codes, coordinates
 Great Circle Mapper: Western Sahara - IATA and ICAO codes

Western Sahara
 
Airports
Airports
Western Sahara